Lophocampa teffeana is a moth of the family Erebidae. It was described by William Schaus in 1933. It is found in Brazil.

References

External links
 Natural History Museum Lepidoptera generic names catalog

teffeana
Moths described in 1933